The 2015–16 Arizona Coyotes season was the 37th season for the National Hockey League franchise that was established on June 22, 1979, the 20th season since the franchise relocated from Winnipeg following the 1995–96 NHL season, and the 44th overall, including the World Hockey Association years.

The season began its regular games on October 9, 2015 against the Los Angeles Kings.

Despite being unable to play since 2011 following career-ending injuries, the Coyotes acquired Chris Pronger's contract from the Philadelphia Flyers in a trade that sent Pronger and Nicklas Grossmann to Phoenix in exchange for Sam Gagner and a conditional pick.

Standings

Schedule and results

Pre-season

Regular season

Player statistics 
Final stats

Goaltenders

†Denotes player spent time with another team before joining the Coyotes. Stats reflect time with the Coyotes only.
‡Traded mid-season
Bold/italics denotes franchise record

Awards and honours

Awards

Milestones

Transactions 
The Coyotes have been involved in the following transactions during the 2015–16 season.

Trades

Free agents acquired

Free agents lost

Claimed via waivers

Lost via waivers

Player signings 
The following players were signed by the Coyotes. Two-way contracts are marked with an asterisk (*).

Draft picks

Below are the Arizona Coyotes' selections at the 2015 NHL Entry Draft, to be held on June 26–27, 2015 at the BB&T Center in Sunrise, Florida.

Draft notes
  The Chicago Blackhawks' first-round pick went to the Arizona Coyotes as the result of a trade on February 28, 2015 that sent Antoine Vermette to Chicago in exchange for Klas Dahlbeck and this pick.
  The Calgary Flames' third-round pick went to the Arizona Coyotes as the result of a trade on June 27, 2015 that sent a 2015 second-round pick to Calgary in exchange for a 2013 third round pick (from Washington) and this pick.
  The Minnesota Wild's third-round pick went to the Arizona Coyotes as the result of a trade on January 14, 2015 that sent Devan Dubnyk to Minnesota in exchange for this pick.
  The Washington Capitals' third-round pick went to the Arizona Coyotes as the result of a trade on June 27, 2015 that sent Tampa Bay's second-round pick in 2015 (60th overall) to Calgary in exchange for a third-round pick in 2015 (76th overall) and this pick.
Calgary previously acquired this pick as the result of a trade on March 1, 2015 that sent Curtis Glencross to Washington in exchange for a second-round pick in 2015 and this pick.
 The Arizona Coyotes' fourth-round pick went to the Carolina Hurricanes as the result of a trade on February 28, 2015 that sent Tim Gleason to Washington in exchange for Jack Hillen and this pick.
Washington previously acquired this pick as the result of a trade on March 4, 2014 that sent Martin Erat and John Mitchell to Phoenix in exchange for Rostislav Klesla, Chris Brown and this pick.
 The Arizona Coyotes' sixth-round pick went to the Tampa Bay Lightning as the result of a trade on June 29, 2014 that sent Sam Gagner and B. J. Crombeen to Arizona in exchange for this pick.

References

Arizona Coyotes seasons
Arizona Coyotes season, 2015-16
Arizona Coyotes
Arizona Coyotes